, also titled The Story of the Last Chrysanthemum and The Story of the Late Chrysanthemums, is a 1939 Japanese drama film directed by Kenji Mizoguchi. Based on a short story by Shōfu Muramatsu, it follows an onnagata (male actor specialising in playing female roles) struggling for artistic mastery in late 19th century Japan.

Plot
Kikunosuke Onoe, generally called Kiku, is the adopted son of a famous Tokyo kabuki actor, who is training to succeed his father in an illustrious career. Whilst hypocritically praising Onoe's acting to his face, the rest of his father's troupe deride him behind his back. Otoku, who lives at the father's house as the young wet-nurse of the infant son of the father's natural son, is the only one frank enough to disclose his artistic shortcomings and urge him to improve himself. When Otoku is dismissed by Kiku's family for her over-closeness to the young master, with the potential for scandal, Kiku tracks her down and states that he wishes to marry her. His family is outraged and Kiku is forced to leave Tokyo, taking the train to Nagoya, honing his art away from his father, much to the latter's wrath.

One year later, Kiku is acting alongside his uncle, Tamiro Naritaya in Osaka, but remains dissatisfied and wishes to join a traveling troupe. Then Otoku tracks down Kiku and re-inspires him. She becomes his common law wife and continues to encourage him. When his uncle dies, four years later, he decides to join a travelling troupe and their times together become even harder. A further four years pass and we see Kiku and Otoku on the road, their fellow actors squabbling over small amounts of money. Kiku has changed in character to the point where he even strikes her. She still loves him, but his love has clearly faded. Their position worsens and Otoku becomes very sick.

Otoku goes to meet Kiku's brother to beg that he be given an acting role in Tokyo, re-using the famous family name. He agrees that Kiku can play the part he was due to play on two conditions: one, that his acting has improved; two, that he and Otoku separate, as this is needed to reconcile with their father. Fuku returns with Otoku to fetch Kiku.

Kiku gives a bravura performance of Sumizome, a difficult and critical female role. He has at last found his niche and the fame he had always sought as a kabuki actor. Otoku watches sadly from the wings, but she is happy for him. The family agree that Kiku may perform in Tokyo. As Kiku boards the train to Tokyo Otoku cannot be found, and Fuku hands him a letter from her, explaining everything. His companions explain that he must continue to Tokyo in order to make Otoku's sacrifice worthwhile. He is a success.

The Tokyo troupe visit Osaka and have a triumphant welcome. Kiku's father says that Kiku may take pride of place in the river parade after the performance. The landlord comes and tells Kiku that Otoku is ill and will die that night. Kiku hesitates as it is his evening of glory, but his father forces him, saying how much Otoku helped him. Ultimately Kiku's father accepts Kiku's marriage to Otoku and Kiku tells her this, but this reconciliation comes only when she is already on her deathbed (due, by implication, to tuberculosis). Proud that he is at last happy, she urges him to join the river parade because the audience is waiting to see and praise him.

She dies, while the theater's parade led by her husband can be heard in the distance.

Cast
 Shōtarō Hanayagi as Kikunosuke Onoe (Kiku)
 Kōkichi Takada as Fukusuke Nakamura (Fuku)
 Gonjurō Kawarazaki as Kikugoro Onoue, the father
 Kakuko Mori as Otoku
 Tokusaburo Arashi as Shikan Nakamura 
 Yōko Umemura as Osato
 Benkei Shiganoya as Kikuguro's wife
Kinnosuke Takamatsu as Matsusuke Onoe

Production
The Story of the Last Chrysanthemums was Mizoguchi's first film for the Shochiku studios after a short interlude at Shinkō Kinema. It was also the initial film of what later was regarded as a trilogy about theater during the Meiji period (the others being the lost A Woman of Osaka [Naniwa onna, 1940] and The Life of an Actor [Geidō Ichidai Otoko, 1941]). The film ranked second in Kinema Junpo'''s list of best films of the year, and it won Mizoguchi an Education Ministry Award.

Muramatsu's short story was based on kabuki actor Kikunosuke Onoe II (尾上 菊之助(2代目), 1868–1897).

Legacy
Many critics regard the film as Mizoguchi's major pre-war achievement, if not his best work, lauding its cinematography, marked by the use of long takes and frequent dolly shots, and emphasising its theme of female concern. In his 1985 review for the Chicago Reader, Jonathan Rosenbaum pointed out Mizoguchi's "refusal to use close-ups" and argued that "the theme of female sacrifice that informs most of his major works is given a singular resonance and complexity here." Richard Brody, writing for The New Yorker, called it "one of the cinema's great outpourings of imaginative energy." John Pym praised the film's sets, which were "crammed with human detail," and, when "sometimes offset by shots of notably uncluttered spaces," highlighted "the isolation of the two principles in a teeming world dominated by class prejudice, harsh economics, and sheer blank human indifference."The Story of the Last Chrysanthemums'' was selected for the Cannes Classics section of the 2015 Cannes Film Festival, where it was shown in a restored print.

See also
 Zangiku monogatari (1956 film)

References

External links
 
 
 
 
 
 

1939 films
Films directed by Kenji Mizoguchi
Japanese black-and-white films
Films about actors
Films with screenplays by Yoshikata Yoda
Films with screenplays by Matsutarō Kawaguchi
Japanese drama films
1939 drama films
Films based on short fiction